Itsmyluckyday (foaled in Kentucky on March 31, 2010) is an American Thoroughbred racehorse. Itsmyluckyday is a multiple graded stakes winner who finished second in the 2013 Preakness Stakes to Oxbow and won the Woodward Stakes in 2014.

Background
Itsmyluckyday is a dark brown horse bred by Liberation Farm & Brandywine Farm. He was from the second crop of foals sired by Lawyer Ron, the American Champion Older Male Horse of 2007 when he won the Whitney Handicap and the Woodward Stakes.

In March 2012, the colt was consigned to the Ocala Breeders' Sales where he was bought for $110,000 by David Melin.

Racing career

Two-year-old season
Itsmyluckyday began his racing career at his home track at Monmouth Park in New Jersey in a $40,000 maiden race on June 23, 2012. In that five-furlong debut, he broke third, caught the leaders around the turn three wide and drove clear under jockey Angel Serpa to a two-length victory.
In his next start, his trainer Edward Plesa Jr. decided to run him in stakes company in the $60,000 Tyro Stakes at five furlongs at Monmouth. In the Tyro on August 5, Itsmyluckyday broke sixth and finished sixth.

In late August, Plesa took his entire stable down to Calder Race Course for the autumn and winter. On August 25, Itsmyluckyday ran in a listed stakes race called the $75,000 Fasig-Tipton Turf Dash at five furlongs. In this sprint, he broke sixth and advanced to third going into the turn. Itsmyluckyday chased the leaders under jockey Manoel Cruz and drew away to win by four lengths. In his next start, Itsmyluckyday raced in the $100,000 Foolish Pleasure Stakes at a mile and 70 yards at Calder. He broke in fourth under jockey Manoel Cruz, went three wide around the final turn, and drew clear of the field to win by three lengths.

Co-owners Trilogy Stables and Laurie Plesa decided to take a big step up in class November 17 and ship to Delta Downs for the $1,000,000 Grade 3 Delta Jackpot Stakes. That day, Itsmylucky broke  in eighth under jockey Angel Serpa and ran in seventh down the backstretch in the mile and 70 yard contest. He went five wide on the far turn and never made up much ground, finishing sixth. The Jackpot was won by eventual Santa Anita Derby winner Goldencents.

Three weeks later on December 15, Plesa wheeled back Itsmyluckyday in the $100,000 Dania Beach Stakes at one mile on the turf at Gulfstream Park. The colt broke in seventh, picked up a little ground, and ran down the backstretch in sixth. He went around the final turn five wide and nearing the wire started picking off horses late, eventually finishing fourth.

Three-year-old season

On New Year's Day 2013, Itsmyluckyday won the $100,000 Gulfstream Park Derby at a mile on the dirt at Gulfstream Park. He broke  fourth and was quickly moved up to second by jockey Paco Lopez. At the end of the first turn, Itsmyluckyday took the lead by a half length and rounded the field five wide to win by six and three-quarter lengths.

On January 26, 2013, Eddie Plesa entered Itsmyluckyday in the $400,000 Grade 3 Holy Bull Stakes. The competition in the dirt race at Gulfstream Park included Breeders' Cup Juvenile Champion and early Kentucky Derby favorite Shanghai Bobby. Itsmyluckyday broke in third one length off the lead under new jockey Elvis Trujillo. Going into the far turn, he pulled up to the leaders and at the top of the lane engaged Shanghai Bobby. In the last furlong of the mile and one sixteenth race, he put away Shanghai Bobby and won by two lengths.

On March 30, 2013, Itsmyluckyday competed in the $1,000,000 Grade 1 Florida Derby at a mile and one eighth at Gulfstream Park. He broke fourth under  Elvis Trujillo and stalked the leaders around the first turn and down the backstretch. At the top of the lane, he made a bid but lost to eventual Kentucky Derby winner Orb. Itsmyluckyday finished second, two and a half lengths behind Orb, while beating the rest of the field by three lengths or more.

By virtue of his runner-up performance to Orb in the Florida Derby, Itsmyluckyday went off at odds of 9-1 from the eleven post in the 139th Kentucky Derby on May 4, 2013. He broke seventh and moved up to sixth place passing the stands for the first time and down the backstretch.
Pacesetter Palace Malice set sizzling fractions, and all but one horse that was close to the lead fell apart in deep stretch. Itsmyluckyday also fell victim to the pace that day and finished fifteenth, 22 lengths behind winner Orb. Longshot Golden Soul placed second, and Louisiana Derby winner Revolutionary was third.

The Plesas then decided to ship Itsmyluckyday to Baltimore, Maryland, and race in the second jewel of the Triple Crown. At Pimlico Race Course in the $1,000,000 Grade 1 Preakness Stakes on May 18, 2013, Itsmyluckyday drew post nine. He broke sharply in fourth and was in third a head behind second place Goldencents around the clubhouse turn and down the backstretch. At the top of the lane, jockey John Velazquez asked Itsmyluckyday for more and he took off two and half lengths in front of the next horse but still two lengths behind leader Oxbow. Itsmyluckyday finished second, one and three-quarter lengths behind Preakness winner Oxbow. Mylute finished third, and Kentucky Derby winner Orb finished fourth. Itsmyluckyday earned a runner-up check of $240,000.

On his next appearance Itsmyluckyday started second favorite for the Pegasus Stakes at Monmouth Stakes but pulled up injured in a race won by Verrazano. Examinations showed that the horse had sustained a serious pelvic injury: he was off the track for the remainder of the season.

Four-year-old season
Returning as a four-year-old in 2014, Itsmyluckyday had a new regular jockey in Paco Lopez and made steady improvement in his first five starts. As in the previous year, he began his campaign at Gulfstream where he finished fourth to Palace Malice in the Gulfstream Park Handicap before winning the Best of the Rest Stakes in April. He then moved to Monmouth Park where he recorded wins in the Listed Majestic Light Stakes and the Grade III Salvator Mile. In August he returned to Grade I company for the first time since the Preakness and finished second to Moreno in the Whitney Handicap at Saratoga, with Will Take Charge and Palace Malice among those behind. Four weeks later, over the same course and distance, Itsmyluckyday faced Moreno again in the Grade I Woodward Stakes. He tracked Moreno for most of the race before moving up to challenge the leader approaching the final turn. Itsmyluckyday gained the advantage a furlong out and prevailed by half a length to record his first Grade I victory.

On September 27 Itsmyluckyday started 7/10 favourite for the Grade II Kelso Handicap at Belmont Park. Carrying top weight of 
121 pounds he finished third of the seven runners behind Vyjack and River Rocks.

Pedigree

References 

2010 racehorse births
Racehorses bred in Kentucky
Racehorses trained in the United States
Thoroughbred family 23-b